Al Ahmadiya School was a semi-formal private school in Al Ras, Dubai, United Arab Emirates, which is now owned and managed as a museum by the Dubai Culture & Arts Authority.

History
The school was founded in the year 1912 by Sheikh Ahmed Bin Dalmouk, of the pearl trade in the Persian Gulf. Following his demise, his son Sheikh Mohammed Bin Ahmed Bin Dalmouk completed the construction of the school and named it Al Ahmadiya School in honor of his father. The Dubai government worked on the restoration of Al Ahmadiya School in mid-1994 and converted it into a museum that was inaugurated by His Highness Sheikh Hamdan Bin Rashid Al Maktoum on March 20, 2000, representing the genesis of semi-formal education in Dubai. W hen visiting we will be able to see a galore of old desks and chairs upon which Emarati students have graduated from.

References

2000 establishments in the United Arab Emirates
Educational institutions established in 1912
Museums established in 2000
Schools in Dubai
Private schools in the United Arab Emirates
Defunct private schools
Museums in Dubai
History museums in the United Arab Emirates
School museums
History of Dubai
1912 establishments in the British Empire